Daniel Lee Fogg (born 24 August 1987) is an English competitive swimmer who has represented Great Britain in the Olympics, World and European Championships as well as England in the Commonwealth Games. Daniel Fogg specialises in the 1500-metre freestyle and open water swimming events.

Early career
Daniel started his career swimming for London Borough of Waltham Forest (Gators) Swimming Club, representing the club at all levels, also captaining the club. In 2005, Daniel was selected to swim for the Great British Junior team at the European Junior Swimming Championships in Budapest, Hungary.  Daniel came 8th in the 1500m freestyle in a time of 15:42.61.

Daniel Fogg started his education at Chase Lane and later moved on to Rush Croft Sports College in Chingford, London.  He then attended Chingford Foundation School to study A levels in the Sixth form.

Daniel went on to swim for Loughborough University swim team, as well as study sports science at the University.

International career
Daniel was first selected for the senior British team in for the 2008 European Short Course Swimming Championships, competing in both the 400-metre freestyle and 1500-metre freestyle. In 2009, Fogg was selected for the World Championships in Rome, competing in the 10-kilometre event.

Fogg won a bronze medal at the 2010 Commonwealth Games competing in the men's 1500-metre freestyle. At the 2012 Summer Olympics in London, Fogg came 5th in the open water 10-kilometre and 8th in the 1,500-metre freestyle.

See also
 List of Commonwealth Games medallists in swimming (men)

References

English male swimmers
1987 births
Living people
Olympic swimmers of Great Britain
Swimmers at the 2012 Summer Olympics
Alumni of Loughborough University
Commonwealth Games bronze medallists for England
Swimmers at the 2010 Commonwealth Games
Commonwealth Games medallists in swimming
Swimmers at the 2014 Commonwealth Games
European Open Water Swimming Championships medalists
Medallists at the 2010 Commonwealth Games